Marie from the Bay of Angels, also known as Angel Sharks, is a 1997 French movie, written and directed by Manuel Pradal.

Cast 
 Vahina Giocante — Marie
 Frédéric Malgras — Orso
etc.

Music 
The film's score was composed by Carlo Crivelli. Its soundtrack included songs by J J Cale, Beth Hirsch's "I Could Love You Too", and "Oba, La Vem Ela" by Jorge Ben.

Reception

Roger Ebert of the Chicago Sun-Times gave the film 1 out of 4. Ebert was critical of the leading lady "Giocante has been billed as "the new Bardot," and she's off to a good start: Bardot didn't make many good films, either." Ebert was unimpressed by the "recycling exhausted cliches" and found the non-sequential storytelling exhausting, but gave some praise for the scenery, compositions, and "pretty pictures". He concludes "Giocante and Malgras are superficially attractive, although because their characters are empty vessels there's no reason to like them much, or care about them. The movie is cast as a tragedy, and it's tragic, all right: tragic that these kids never developed intelligence and personalities."

Accolades 
The film was in competition for the Tiger Award at the 1998 International Film Festival Rotterdam (IFFR).

References

External links 
 
 Marie Baie des Anges — AlloCiné

1997 films
French drama films
French romance films
Films about children
Films directed by Manuel Pradal
1990s French films